Back to the Rafters is an Australian family comedy-drama television program which premiered on the Amazon Prime Video on September 17, 2021. The series is a spin-off and sequel to Packed to the Rafters, which aired on Seven Network from 2008 to 2013.

In October 2021, the series was not renewed and was officially cancelled By Amazon.

Synopsis
Back to the Rafters picks up six years since we last saw the Rafter family. Dave and Julie have created a new life in the country with youngest daughter Ruby, while the older Rafter children face new challenges and Grandpa Ted struggles to find his place. As Dave enjoys his new-found freedom, Julie must reconcile her responsibilities to the family.

Production
In September 2019, it was reported the cast members were in discussion to revive the series for a 2020 season under the working title Back to the Rafters. The series will not air on Seven Network, instead it will be placed on Amazon Prime Video, which was confirmed in December 2019, along with the return of Rebecca Gibney, Erik Thomson, Jessica Marais, Hugh Sheridan, Angus McLaren, Michael Caton and George Houvardas. Filming commenced in Sydney in 2020.

In February 2020, Jessica Marais dropped out of the series for personal reasons. In March 2020, it was announced Georgina Haig would take over the role of Rachel Rafter.

Production of the series was stopped in March 2020 due to the COVID-19 pandemic. It resumed in September 2020 and filming was completed on 2 October 2020.

Cast

Episodes

Home media 

It was announced by Via Vision Entertainment in May 2022 that they would be releasing the Back To The Rafters on DVD.

Reception

Critical reception
Back to the Rafters was positively received by critics and fans. In a review for The Sydney Morning Herald, Karl Quinn gave the series a rating of 3½ and commented on its "welcome return", and that "Generally, I like my family sagas loaded with vitriol, scheming and skulduggery. Back to the Rafters is definitely not that. But much as I love a Succession or Game of Thrones or Arrested Development, I’m glad there’s still room for a Rafters too." Daryl Sparkes of the website The Conversation stated that "I always found Packed to the Rafters to be honest and authentic. It was relatable because the issues, actions and dialogue of the characters were grounded in realism. He concluded with " this is the key to Rafters continued success. It takes the ordinary in our lives and makes it just a little bit more extraordinary on the screen. It's a great joy to go Back to the Rafters again, after all these years." In a favourable review from James Croot of the New Zealand website Stuff said that "Returning to a series that had seemingly run its course eight years ago could have ended in disaster, but Lee has given this central duo a new stage and lease of life that just might provide enough dramatic tension, tears and laughs to make you fall in love with the Rafters, whether it be for the first time, or all over again."

References

External links

 Welcome to Buradeena at Bundeena Info

2021 Australian television series debuts
2021 Australian television series endings
2020s Australian comedy television series
Australian comedy-drama television series
Sequel television series
English-language television shows
Amazon Prime Video original programming
Television series about families
Television series by Seven Productions
Television productions suspended due to the COVID-19 pandemic